State Highway 46 (SH-46) is a  state highway in southern Idaho that runs north–south across the Magic Valley region. It connects U.S. Route 30 (US-30) in Buhl to Interstate 84 (I-84) in Wendell, US-26 in Gooding, and US-20 east of Fairfield.

Route description

SH-46 begins at a junction with US 30 in eastern Buhl, located in Twin Falls County. The highway travels north along North 1500 East (Clear Lakes Road), skirting the east side of the city and crossing the tracks of the Eastern Idaho Railroad, and travels through a rural area while descending a 6 percent grade near Clear Springs. SH-46 crosses over the Snake River on Ken Curtis Bridge near Clear Lake Park and enters Gooding County, ascending from the river canyon and turning east onto 3500 South (Bob Barton Road). The highway continues north on the Rex Leland Highway to an interchange with Interstate 84 in southern Wendell.

SH-46 travels north through Wendell on Idaho Street and intersects Main Street, which carries a short spur route that connects it to another interchange with I-84. The highway continues north to Gooding, where it intersects US 26 and passes the Idaho School for the Deaf and Blind. After leaving the city and crossing the Big Wood River, SH-46 veers northeasterly to avoid several buttes and hills in the Mount Bennett Hills, crossing into Camas County.

History
SH-46 originally terminated at the I-84 interchange in Wendell, while the remaining  of the Rex Leland Highway to Buhl was under local ownership. The Ken Curtis Bridge, connecting the highway to Buhl, was constructed over the Snake River in 1968. In 1997, the Idaho Transportation Department (ITD) agreed to take over maintenance and ownership of the highway once right of way for a wider roadway was acquired and prepared. Planning for the new highway, including several alternative routings between Buhl and the Wendell interchange, began in 1999. Major reconstruction of the highway was completed in 2009 and the ITD agreed in September 2010 to sign the highway as part of SH-46.

Major intersections

Spur route

State Highway 46 Spur is a short route connecting I-84 and SH-46 in Wendell.

References

External links

 

046
Transportation in Camas County, Idaho
Transportation in Gooding County, Idaho
Transportation in Twin Falls County, Idaho